Project Adventure is an international nonprofit education organization based in Beverly, Massachusetts. The mission of Project Adventure is to provide leadership in the expansion of adventure-based experiential programming.

History
Project Adventure began as an adventure-based physical education program at the Hamilton-Wenham Regional High School in Massachusetts in 1971. Across approximately half a heavily wooded acre behind the school, a range of stations were installed including a low tightrope, a "monkey bridge" approximately twenty feet above ground, and a trapeze hanging about six feet away from a small platform at the top of a tall pegged pole.  At this latter station, students on belay climbed the pole, stood upright on the small platform, and leaped across to try to grasp the trapeze.  Students developed problem solving and collaboration skills, as well as overcoming fears and gaining confidence in their physical abilities.  Another related tradition at the school was the infamous "mud walk" where students in the biology program were lashed together for a walk through the Miles River swamp which abutted the Project Adventure grounds. The shortest of students often needed to be helped by others from disappearing below the surface; this support did not always keep them from being submerged temporarily, and all clothes had to be discarded after the activity.  However, students were always permitted to opt out of the Project Adventure exercises and the mud walk.

By applying Outward Bound's adventure learning principles in schools, the organization received federal funding to expand its programs across the United States. This high school is located in Hamilton Massachusetts and in 2011 placed as the 9th best school in Massachusetts.

See also
 Association for Experiential Education
 Karl Rohnke

References

External links
Project Adventure website

Non-profit organizations based in Massachusetts
Youth organizations based in Massachusetts
Outdoor education organizations
Educational organizations based in the United States
Beverly, Massachusetts